Jatibarang is a district (Indonesian: Kecamatan) in Indramayu Regency of West Java, Indonesia.

Jatibarang is located 19 kilometres south of the City of Indramayu.

List of villages
 Bulak Lor
 Bulak
 Jatibarang Baru
 Jatibarang
 Jatisawit Lor
 Jatisawit
 Kalimati
 Kebulen
 Krasak
 Lobener Lor
 Lobener
 Malangsemirang
 Pawidean
 Pilangsari
 Sukalila

Districts of West Java